Njáll Trausti Friðbertsson (born 31 December 1969) is an Icelandic Independence Party politician. He was elected to the Althing in 2016, by the Northeast constituency.

Born in Reykjavík, he has been an air traffic controller in Akureyri since 1992. He graduated in Business Administration from the University of Akureyri in 2004. He and his wife Guðrún Gyða Hauksdóttir have two sons.

References

1969 births
Living people
Politicians from Reykjavík
Independence Party (Iceland) politicians
Air traffic controllers
Members of the Althing